Cloghanboy (Homan) is a townland in Athlone, County Westmeath, Ireland. The townland is in the civil parish of St. Mary's.

The townland is located in the north of the town, Cloghanboy (Cooke) and Cloghanboy (Strain) border the townland to the east.

References 

Townlands of County Westmeath